Tubbercurry is a Gaelic Athletic Association club based in the town of Tubbercurry, County Sligo; the club was formed in 1888. They have won 20 Sligo Senior Football Championships and 14 Sligo Senior Hurling Championships. They have also won 9 Sligo Senior Football League (Division 1) titles. At underage they have won 10 Sligo Minor Football Championships and 7 Sligo Under 20 Football Championships. One of the greatest hurlers in Sligo history, Paul Seevers played with the club for a number of years winning many medals with both the Gaelic football and Hurling teams. The club combines with Cloonacool at underage level.

Honours

 Sligo Senior Football Championship: (20)
 1890, 1917, 1918, 1924, 1927, 1928, 1930, 1934, 1938, 1939, 1940, 1946, 1950, 1951, 1955, 1957, 1976, 1986, 1991, 2014
 Sligo Senior Hurling Championship: (13)
 1969, 1977, 1995, 1996, 1997, 1998, 1999, 2000, 2001, 2002, 2003, 2004, 2006
 Sligo Junior Football Championship: (1)
 1995
 Sligo Under 21 Football Championship: (7)
 1978, 1979, 1980, 1981, 1983, 2007, 2017
 Sligo Minor Football Championship: (10)
 1942, 1953, 1955, 1959, 1974, 1976, 1977, 1978, 1994, 2005
 Sligo Under-16 Football Championship: (3)
 1959, 1961, 1993
 Sligo Under-14 Football Championship: (4)
 1975, 1991, 2010, 2015
 Sligo Senior Football League (Division 1): (9)
 1950, 1954, 1955, 1957, 1958, 1974, 1987, 1991, 1993
 Kiernan Cup: (2)
 2014 , 2018
 Benson Cup:''' (1)
 2013

References

Hurling clubs in County Sligo
Gaelic football clubs in County Sligo
Gaelic games clubs in County Sligo